Megachile scheviakovi is a species of bee in the family Megachilidae. It was described by Theodore Dru Alison Cockerell in 1928.

References

Scheviakovi
Insects described in 1928